This is a list of countries by credit rating, showing long-term foreign currency credit ratings for sovereign bonds as reported by the largest three major credit rating agencies: Standard & Poor's, Fitch, and Moody's. The list also includes all country subdivisions not issuing sovereign bonds, but it excludes regions, provinces and municipalities issuing sub-sovereign bonds.

Countries' and regions' ratings in different methods

Standard & Poor's

For S&P, a bond is considered investment grade if its credit rating is BBB− or higher. Bonds rated BB+ and below are considered to be speculative grade, sometimes also referred to as "junk" bonds. An SD rating indicates that the country has selectively defaulted on some outstanding obligations

Fitch

For Fitch, a bond is considered investment grade if its credit rating is BBB− or higher. Bonds rated BB+ and below are considered to be speculative grade, sometimes also referred to as "junk" bonds. Fitch Ratings typically does not assign outlooks to sovereign ratings below B− (CCC and lower) or modifiers. CCC indicates 'Substantial Credit Risk' where 'default is a real possibility'. CC indicates 'Very High Levels of Credit Risk' where 'default of some kind appears probable'.

Moody's

For Moody's, a bond is considered investment grade if its credit rating is Baa3 or higher. Bonds rated Ba1 and below are considered to be speculative grade, sometimes also referred to as "junk" bonds.

DBRS Morningstar

For DBRS Morningstar, a bond is considered investment grade if its credit rating is BBB(low) or higher. Bonds rated BB(high) and below are considered to be speculative grade, sometimes also referred to as "junk" bonds.

Scope Ratings

For Scope – the European rating agency – a bond is considered investment grade if its credit rating is BBB− or higher. Bonds rated BB+ and below are considered to be speculative grade, sometimes also referred to as "junk" bonds.

JCR
Japan Credit Rating Agency (JCR) is a credit rating agency based in Japan. JCR is a Nationally Recognized Statistical Rating Organization by the U.S. Securities and Exchange Commission.

China Chengxin

China Chengxin Credit Rating Group is a credit rating agency based in China.

Not rated

See also
 Bond credit rating
 United States federal government credit-rating downgrades
 List of US states by credit rating
 World debt

References

credit rating
Credit rating